The Shadow Leader of the House of Commons is a member of the Official Opposition Shadow Cabinet responsible for working with the Leader of the House in arranging Commons business and holding the Government to account in its overall management of the House. The Shadow Leader also responds to the Business Statement of Leader of House each Thursday, though the Leader of the Opposition exercised this role until the late 1980s. The office is roughly equivalent to the Shadow Leader of the House of Lords.

Shadow Leaders (British Parliament)

Notes

References

See also 

 Opposition House Leader (Canada)

Official Opposition (United Kingdom)